Curt White (born 1962) was an Olympic weightlifter for the United States in the 1988 Summer Olympics.  He is a Chiropractor in Mooresville, North Carolina.

Education
He obtained his degree from Eastern Illinois University in Charleston, Illinois and also graduated from Logan College of Chiropractic in St. Louis, Missouri in 1988.

Olympics
Dr. White was a member of the 1988 Olympic Weightlifting team and participated in Olympic Weightlifting for over 20 years. Throughout his time as an Olympic Weightlifter, he held and still holds several National Records. White was inducted into The US Olympic Weightlifting Hall of Fame in 1998.

Weightlifting achievements
Olympic Games team member (1988)
Senior National Champion (1977, 1982, 1983, 1985, 1986, & 1988)
All-time Senior American record holder in clean and jerk and total
All-time Junior American record holder in snatch, clean and jerk, and total
Youngest Senior National Champion age 14, 114 lbs. class*

References

External links
Curt White - Hall of Fame at Weightlifting Exchange 

1962 births
Living people
American male weightlifters
Olympic weightlifters of the United States
Weightlifters at the 1988 Summer Olympics
American chiropractors
Logan University alumni